Yellow Moon is the fourth EP and sixth album released by Japanese pop and folk artist Akeboshi. Sony Music Entertainment Japan released the EP on April 19, 2006; Sony later released it in America under the Epic Records label. The album's title track "Yellow Moon" garnered fame as the thirteenth ending to Naruto.

Track listing

Personnel
 - Guitar, Vocals, Piano
Inoue Yousui - Lyrics

Release history

References

2006 EPs
Akeboshi albums
Epic Records EPs
Sony Music Entertainment Japan EPs